This is a list of women who held the title Princess of Orange by marriage.

Princess of Orange is the title used by the female heirs apparent and, prior to 2002, spouses of male heirs apparent. The present Princess of Orange, Catharina-Amalia, is the first suo jure holder since Marie (1393–1417), who co-reigned with her husband John (1393–1418). From 1171 to 1815 the title was also used by women married to the Sovereign Princes of Orange during their reigns, and then by wives of heirs apparent to the Dutch throne. On 30 April 2013, after the accession of her father, Willem-Alexander, to the Dutch throne, Catharina-Amalia became Princess of Orange and heir apparent to the throne.

Princesses of Orange

House of Baux

House of Châlon-Arlay

House of Nassau

House of Orange-Nassau

As personal and courtesy title

House of Orange-Nassau

Sources

Orange
Princesses of Orange